Babel was an Iraqi newspaper which was published under the direction of Uday Hussein, the son of Saddam Hussein.

History and profile
Babel was launched during the Gulf War in 1991. It was one of the newspapers owned by Uday Hussein. He was also the founder of the paper which was published both in Arabic and English.

The paper was banned by then Iraqi government for one month in November 2002 for unexplained causes.

References

1991 establishments in Iraq
2002 disestablishments in Iraq
Arabic-language newspapers
Defunct newspapers published in Iraq
English-language newspapers published in Arab countries
Publications established in 1991
Publications disestablished in 2002